IL-19 or IL 19 can refer to:
 Interleukin 19
 Illinois's 19th congressional district
 Illinois Route 19